Pseudocrypturus is a genus of extinct paleognathous bird. One species is known, Pseudocrypturus cercanaxius. It is a relative of such modern birds as ostriches. It lived in the early Eocene.
The holotype fossil is in the collection of the Smithsonian's National Museum of Natural History. It has catalog number USNM 336103. It was collected from the Fossil Butte Member, Green River Formation, Lincoln County, Wyoming.

Taxonomy
 
Pseudocrypturus means false tinamou.

Footnotes

References
  

Bird genera
Eocene genus extinctions
Lithornithidae
Paleogene birds of Europe
Paleogene birds of North America
Fossil taxa described in 1988
Paleontology in Wyoming